Titus Ssematimba (born 15 August 2003) is a Ugandan footballer who plays for Wakiso Giants FC in the Uganda Premier League and the Uganda national team as an attacking midfielder.  During the 2022 CECAFA U-20 Championship in Sudan, Ssematimba was named the player of the tournament.

Career

Wakiso Giants FC
In September 2021, Ssematimba was unveiled at Wakiso Giants FC from the regional side of Black Star FC in Kampala region. On 3rd November 2021, he made his debut for his side of Wakiso Giants FC as it dispatched off SC Villa 3-1 at the Kavumba Recreation Center where he bagged a brace in that match.

National Team

Uganda U20
Ssematimba  played for  Uganda U20 during the 2022 CECAFA U-20 Championship which was held in Sudan in 2022. He made his debut on 29th October 2022, against Tanzania U20 at Al-Hilal Stadium, Omdurman.

Uganda national football team
On 21 September 2022, Ssematimba made his debut on the Uganda during the Tri-national tournament against Uganda.

International goals
Scores and results list Uganda's goal tally first.

Personal life
Ssematimba was born to Godfrey Kibuka Semuwemba and Bridget Nabulya Ssematimba. He started his elementary education at Golden Age Nursery School, Kibuye and joined Kyagwe Road Primary School before joining Yusuf Banaziyo Memorial Primary School, Najjanankumbi on Entebbe road. For secondary school, he studied both his Ordinary and Advanced studies at London College.

Honors
U20 CECAFA player of tournament

References

External links
Titus Ssematimba (Player)
Uganda - T. Sematimba - Profile with news, career statistics and history - Soccerway

Ugandan footballers
2003 births
Living people
Wakiso Giants FC players
People from Kampala District
Association football midfielders
Uganda international footballers
Uganda A' international footballers
2022 African Nations Championship players